Auratote is a location on South Uist in the Outer Hebrides, Scotland. Auratote is within the parish of South Uist.

References

External links

Canmore - South Uist, Cladh Choinnich site record
Canmore - South Uist, Beinn Ruigh Choinnich site record

Villages on South Uist